John Kenneth McKinnon (April 20, 1936 – March 13, 2019) was a Canadian politician and the commissioner of Yukon from 1986 to 1995.

Early life
The son of Alex McKinnon and Catherine Luce, he was educated in Norwood, at St. Paul's College and at the University of Manitoba. McKinnon married Judy S. Chenley. He was vice-president and general manager of Northern Television Services.

McKinnon was a Member of the Yukon Territorial Council from 1961 to 1964 and from 1967 to 1974. McKinnon was then appointed Minister of Local Government in 1974, Minister of Highways and Public Works in 1976. He was then Yukon Administrator of the Northern Pipeline Agency from 1979 to 1984 and appointed Commissioner March 27, 1986 then retired in June 1995. After his retirement, he ran in the 1997 Canadian federal election as Progressive Conservative, coming in fourth in the Yukon riding. McKinnon was chancellor of Yukon College from 2000 to 2004.

In 2007, he was named chair of the Yukon Environmental and Socio-Economic Assessment Board.

In March 2019, the Yukon legislature announced that McKinnon had died. He was 82.

References

External links
 Biography from Indian and Northern Affairs Canada
 The Canadian Encyclopedia

1936 births
2019 deaths
Businesspeople from Winnipeg
Commissioners of Yukon
Members of the Yukon Territorial Council
Politicians from Whitehorse
Politicians from Winnipeg